Ratua Assembly constituency is an assembly constituency in Malda district in the Indian state of West Bengal.

Overview
As per orders of the Delimitation Commission, No. 48 Ratua Assembly constituency covers Ratua I community development block and Araidanga, Paranpur, Pukuria and Sambalpur gram panchayats of Ratua II community development block.

Ratua Assembly constituency is part of No. 7 Maldaha Uttar (Lok Sabha constituency). It was earlier part of Raiganj (Lok Sabha constituency).

Members of Legislative Assembly

Election results

2021
In the 2021 election, Samar Mukherjee of Trinamool Congress defeated his nearest rival, Abhishek Singhania of BJP.

2016
In the 2016 election, Samar Mukherjee of Congress defeated his nearest rival, Shehnaz Quadery of Trinamool Congress.

2011
In the 2011 election, Samar Mukherjee of Congress defeated his nearest rival Sailen Sarkar of CPI(M).

.# Swing based on Congress+Trinamool Congress vote percentage in 2011.

1977–2006
In the 2006 and 2001 state assembly elections, Sailen Sarkar of CPI(M) won the Ratua assembly seat defeating Asit Bose and Samar Mukherjee, both of Congress, respectively. Contests in most years were multi cornered but only winners and runners are being mentioned. Samar Mukherjee of Congress defeated Mozammel Haque of CPI(M) in 1996. Mumtaz Begum of CPI(M) defeated Biswanath Guha and Niren Chandra Sinha, both of Congress, in 1991 and 1987 respectively. Samar Mukherjee of Congress defeated Mohammad Ali of CPI(M) in 1982. Mohammad Ali of CPI(M) defeated Niren Chandra Sinha of Congress in 1977.

1951–1972
Nirendra Chandra Sinha of Congress won in 1972 and 1971. Mohammad Ali, Independent, won in 1969. Sourindra Mohan Mishra of Congress won in 1967. Dhanswar Saha of Congress won the Ratua seat in 1962. Ratua was a joint seat in 1957. Sourindra Mohan Mishra and Dhaneswar Saha, both of Congress, won in 1957. In independent India's first election in 1951, Md. Sayeed Mia of Congress won the Ratua seat.

References

Assembly constituencies of West Bengal
Politics of Malda district